Cham Khazam or Chamkhazam may refer to:
 Cham Khazam 1
 Cham Khazam 2